Sparganothoides aciculana is a species of moth of the family Tortricidae. It is found in the highlands of central Mexico.

The length of the forewings is 8.7–10.2 mm for males and about 10.4 mm for females. The ground colour of the forewings is yellowish brown to bronze-greyish brown. The hindwings are white.

Etymology
The species name refers to the narrow apices of the socii/gnathos arms and is derived from Latin acicula or acus (meaning needle).

References

Moths described in 2009
Sparganothoides